Live at Woodstock is a live album documenting Joe Cocker's famous performance with The Grease Band at Woodstock Festival on 17 August 1969. It was released officially for the first time in 2009 by A&M/Universal.

Track listing
 "Dear Landlord" (Bob Dylan ) - 8:41
 "Something's Coming On" (Joe Cocker / Chris Stanton ) - 04:03
 "Do I Still Figure in Your Life" (Pete Dello ) - 3:59
 "Feelin' Alright" (Dave Mason ) - 5:23
 "Just Like a Woman"  (Bob Dylan ) - 6:23
 "Let's Go Get Stoned" (Nickolas Ashford / Valerie Simpson ) - 7:06
 "I Don't Need No Doctor" (Jo Armstead / Nickolas Ashford / Valerie Simpson ) - 12:13
 "I Shall Be Released" (Bob Dylan ) - 5:59
 "Hitchcock Railway" (Don Dunn / Tony McCashen ) - 5:51
 "Something to Say" (Joe Cocker / Peter Nichols ) - 9:22
 "With a Little Help from My Friends" (John Lennon / Paul McCartney ) - 8:06

Personnel
 Joe Cocker - lead vocals
 Henry McCullough - lead guitar
 Neil Hubbard - rhythm guitar
 Alan Spenner - bass
 Bruce Rowland - drums
 Chris Stainton - keyboard
 Bobby Torres - congas

References

2009 live albums
Joe Cocker live albums